Siah Rudbar (also Romanized as Sīāh Rūdbār) is a village in Zarrin Gol Rural District, in the Central District of Aliabad County, Golestan Province, Iran. At the 2006 census, its population was 266, in 77 families.

References 

Populated places in Aliabad County